Pau Morer Vicente (born 10 October 1995) is a Spanish professional footballer.

Club career
Born in Blanes, Girona, Catalonia, Morer began playing football with local CD Blanes, going on to have spells with RCD Espanyol, FC Barcelona, Girona FC, Fundaciò Calella and CF Damm.

On 9 October 2013, he signed a one-year deal with English Premier League club Swansea City to play for their U21 team. After one year with Girona FC B, on 5 August 2015 Morer signed for Norwegian Tippeligaen club Sandefjord Fotball on 18-month deal. Morer left Sandefjord at the end of the 2018 season.

In 2019 he signed for FK Žalgiris After season he left FK Žalgiris.In 2019 A lyga season he played 24 matches and scored 7 goals.

Career statistics

Club

Honours
Individual
 A Lyga Player of the Month: April 2019

References

External links
 

1995 births
Living people
People from Selva
Sportspeople from the Province of Girona
Spanish footballers
Footballers from Catalonia
Association football midfielders
CF Damm players
Girona FC B players
Sandefjord Fotball players
Norwegian First Division players
Eliteserien players
Spanish expatriate footballers
Expatriate footballers in Norway
Spanish expatriate sportspeople in Norway
Expatriate footballers in Lithuania
Spanish expatriate sportspeople in Lithuania